Grushko is a gender-neutral Slavic surname that may refer to
Abram Grushko (1918–1980), Soviet painter
Olga Grushko (born 1976), Kazakhstani volleyball player

Films and TV
Grushko is a 1994's BBC three part drama series starring Brian Cox and Stephen McGann

See also
Grushko theorem in mathematics